Alexandro da Silva Batista, known as Alexandro, (born November 6, 1986) is a Brazilian footballer who currently plays for Sampaio Corrêa RJ.

Alexandro previously made six Campeonato Brasileiro appearances for Botafogo.

Honours
Campeonato Carioca Second Level: 2007, 2009
Campeonato Carioca Second Level top scorer: 2009

References

External links
 
 
 
 Alexandro at ZeroZero

1986 births
Living people
People from Cabo Frio
Association football forwards
Brazilian footballers
Brazilian expatriate footballers
Expatriate footballers in Malaysia
Expatriate footballers in South Korea
Expatriate footballers in the United Arab Emirates
Campeonato Brasileiro Série A players
Campeonato Brasileiro Série B players
Campeonato Brasileiro Série C players
Campeonato Brasileiro Série D players
Malaysia Super League players
K League 1 players
UAE Pro League players
Associação Desportiva Cabofriense players
Selangor FA players
Joinville Esporte Clube players
Resende Futebol Clube players
Botafogo de Futebol e Regatas players
Esporte Clube Santo André players
America Football Club (RJ) players
Pohang Steelers players
Duque de Caxias Futebol Clube players
Santa Cruz Futebol Clube players
Clube Náutico Capibaribe players
Macaé Esporte Futebol Clube players
Tupi Football Club players
Bangu Atlético Clube players
Associação Desportiva Recreativa e Cultural Icasa players
Associação Atlética Ponte Preta players
Emirates Club players
Esporte Clube Bahia players
Paysandu Sport Club players
Grêmio Novorizontino players
Oeste Futebol Clube players
Associação Atlética Portuguesa (RJ) players
Sampaio Corrêa Futebol Clube players
Guarany Sporting Club players
Sampaio Corrêa Futebol e Esporte players
Sportspeople from Rio de Janeiro (state)